Kadyrov is a surname that may refer to:

 Akhmad Kadyrov (1951–2004), former president of Chechnya
 Khalid Kadyrov (born 1994), Russian footballer
 Ochil Kadyrov (1910–1945), World War II Hero of the Soviet Union
 Ramzan Kadyrov (born 1976), head of Chechnya; son of Akhmad
 Rashid Kadyrov, Prosecutor General in the government of Uzbekistan in 2004
 Vladislav Kadyrov (born 1970), Azerbaijani/Russian footballer and coach

Russian-language surnames
Patronymic surnames
Surnames from given names